Ritland is a Norwegian language habitational surname. Notable people with the name include:
 Mike Ritland, American motivational speaker
 Osmond J. Ritland (1909–1991), United States Air Force general

See also
Ritland crater

Norwegian-language surnames
Norwegian toponymic surnames
Americanized surnames